Pachamama Raymi (Quechua Pachamama Mother Earth, raymi feast, "Mother Earth feast") is a ceremony held annually on August 1 in Ecuador and Peru.

Location

Ecuador
In Ecuador, the feast is celebrated in the Zamora-Chinchipe Province.

Peru
In Peru it takes place in the Ccatca District of the Cusco Region, Quispicanchi Province, on August 1.

See also
 Willka Raymi

References 

Festivals in Ecuador
Festivals in Peru
Cusco Region
Zamora-Chinchipe Province
August observances